Angels at Risk is a 501(c)(3) non-profit charitable organization in Los Angeles, California, United States, founded by Susie Spain, Ted Danson, Mary Steenburgen, Jesse Sisgold and Tom Nolan that focuses on the issue of drug and alcohol use and abuse in kids, teens, and families through their prevention education programs, services, trainings, and curriculum.

History 

Angels at Risk formally became their own 501(c)(3) in 2007, having been a program of both Paul Cummin’s New Visions Foundation and Robyn and Mel Gibson’s Malibu Foundation for Youth & Families prior to 2007. In 1998, then Assemblywoman Sheila Kuehl attended a summit for all of the schools in West Los Angeles. This meeting highlighted the drug and alcohol crisis for teenagers in their community. Several high schools were in attendance including: Santa Monica High, Palisades Charter High, Venice High, Malibu High and Crossroads High. Since that time, Angels at Risk has served the school communities mentioned above and their programs and services have been consistently active on the Westside of Los Angeles from Inglewood to Malibu honoring Angels at Risk’s two main concepts; unity and family.

References 

1. "Angels at Risk." GuideStar. GuideStar USA, Inc, n.d. Web. 19 Jan. 2017.

2. "Angels at Risk." Beverly Hills Courier 17 Oct. 2014: n. pag. Print.

3. Wall, Paige. "Angels at Risk Founder to Be Honored at Polo in the Palisades Fundraiser." Santa Monica Patch. Patch Media, 24 Sept. 2014. Web. 27 Jan. 2017.

4. "Angels at Risk." Hollywood Reporter Jan. 2013: 55.

5. Sweet & Associates, Katy, and Marian Willardson, MWPR. Angels at Risk and the Jena and Michael King Foundation Host "Stand Up to Addiction in the Name of Prevention". 30 Jan. 2012. Angels at Risk 2012 Event Press Release. Los Angeles, California.

6. "Angels in the Palisades." Palisadian Post. Pacific Palisades Post, 23 Feb. 2012. Web. 27 Jan. 2017.

7. Mozena, Kari. "All the Parties Fit to Crash." Los Angeles Magazine Apr. 2012: 30.

8. "Star Sightings." Entertainment Tonight. CBS Studios Inc., 2012. Web. 27 Jan. 2017.

9. "Angels at Risk Reach Out to S.M. Youth." Santa Monica Daily Press 2011: n. pag. Print.

10. Nolan, Tom. "A Message to the Students." Crossfire [Santa Monica] Jan. 2008: 5. Print.

11. "Angels at Risk." Beverly Hills Courier Jan. 2008: 21. Print.

12. Mangum, Joan. "Fred Segal for Angels at Risk." Beverly Hills Courier 21 Sept. 2007: 12. Print.

13. Jenson, Hillary. "Support Group Reaches Out to Families Suffering from Addiction." The Current [Malibu] Mar. 2005: n. pag. Print.

14. Sudderth, Carolanne. "Drug Education, Prevention Programs Opens at Malibu High." The Malibu Times 19 Feb. 2004: n. pag. Print.

15. Kirst, Julie. "Susie Spain and Angels at Risk." The Argonaut [Santa Monica] 18 Nov. 2004: n. pag. Print.

16. Bogdanovich, Antonia. "Parents' Negligence Breeds Delinquents." Santa Monica Daily Press 24 Apr. 2002: n. pag. Print.

17. Sweet & Associates, Katy. Fred Segal Santa Monica to Support Local Charity Angels at Risk with Sale of Customed-Designed T-Shirts on Thursday, September 27, 2007. 7 Oct. 2011. Angels at Risk and Fred Segal Press Release. Santa Monica, California.

18. Angels at Risk: Southern California Juvenile Courts Dissolved by Susie Spain

19. Angels at Risk page 18

20. Angels at Risk Benefit Brunch Hosted by Jena King 

21. Nonprofit Supports Fight Against Alcohol, Drug Abuse

22. Nonprofit Supports Fight Against Alcohol, Drug Abuse, Page 22, Print

External links 

 Official website

Charities based in California
Organizations established in 1997